Erast Petrovich Fandorin is a fictional 19th-century Russian detective and the hero of a series of Russian historical detective novels by Boris Akunin.

The first Fandorin novel (The Winter Queen, Russian: Азазель) was published in Russia in 1998, and the latest and the last one in 2018 (Not Saying Goodbye, Russian: Не прощаюсь). More than 15 million copies of Fandorin novels have been sold as of May 2006, even though the novels were freely available from many Russian websites and the hard copies were relatively expensive by Russian standards. New books in the Fandorin series typically sell over 200,000 copies in the first week alone, with an unparalleled (for mystery novels) first edition of 50,000 copies for the first books to 500,000 copies for the last.

The English translations of the novels have been critically acclaimed by, among others, Ruth Rendell.

Background
In the Soviet Union, detective novels enjoyed mass popularity. Although they were seen as a "low genre" by the communist officials, both local (such as Igor (Georgy) Vayner and Julian Semenov), and foreign detective novels have always been avidly coveted.

After the collapse of the Soviet Union, many trashy detective novels were published that featured a lot of gore and sex. Akunin's wife, in common with many other Russians, started to enjoy reading this genre of literature. However, she did not want to be seen reading the novels and she always wrapped them in brown paper to prevent people from seeing what she was reading. This inspired Akunin to create a detective novel which nobody would be ashamed to be caught reading, something between the literature of Leo Tolstoy and Fyodor Dostoevsky and the pulp of modern Russian detective novels.

He set out to write a cycle about Fandorin with an exploration of every subgenre of the detective novel in mind, from spies to serial killers. In addition, he wanted to address different types of human character in his books. As Akunin identified sixteen subgenres of crime novels, as well as sixteen character types, the novels in the Erast Fandorin series ultimately numbered sixteen, with the final novel, Not Saying Goodbye, published in 2018. The series is titled  (New detective, or New Mystery). This title serves to set the novels apart from the postmodernist intellectual novels as well as from the trashy detective novels, but it is also a subtle play on the use of time in the novels.

Akunin uses many historical settings for his novels. He uses the war between Russia and the Ottoman Empire as background for the novel The Turkish Gambit; the death of the "White General" Mikhail Skobelev (as 'Mikhail Sobolev') in The Death of Achilles; and the coronation of Tsar Nicholas II and the Khodynka Tragedy for Coronation, or the Last of the Romanovs. Akunin uses the gaps in the knowledge of these histories to create an atmosphere for his mystery novels to which readers can relate.

References

External sources
Dmitry Babich, "The Return of Patriotism?", retrieved 17 August 2006.
Rebecca Reich, The St. Petersburg Times, "Akunin's plot thickens", retrieved 17 August 2006.
Author's Website: www.akunin.ru Includes the complete texts, in Russian, of the first six Erast Fandorin novels.
Fan site Fandorin.ru
Erast P. Fandorin Virtual Museum
The Moscow News, "Boris Akunin: Murder by Cliches", retrieved 7 September 2006.
Leon Aron, "A champion for the bourgeoisie: reinventing virtue and citizenship in Boris Akunin's novels" in The National Interest, Spring 2004, retrieved 29 September 2006.
Akunin website containing the Russian texts of all Erast Fandorin novels through The Diamond Chariot

Characters in detective novel series
Characters in Russian novels of the 21st century
Literary characters introduced in 1998
Fictional people from the 19th-century
Fictional historical detectives
Fictional Russian police detectives
Fictional Russian people in literature
Novel sequences
Novels by Boris Akunin